The Lashkar-e-Jhangvi (LeJ) or "Army of Jhangvi", is a Deobandi Sunni Muslim supremacist, terrorist and Jihadist militant organisation based in Afghanistan. The organisation operates in Pakistan and Afghanistan and is an offshoot of anti-Shia party Sipah-e-Sahaba Pakistan (SSP). The LeJ was founded by former SSP activists Riaz Basra, Malik Ishaq, Akram Lahori, and Ghulam Rasool Shah.

The LeJ has claimed responsibility for various mass casualty attacks against the Shia community in Pakistan, including multiple bombings that killed over 200 Hazara Shias in Quetta in  2013. It has also been linked to the Mominpura Graveyard attack in 1998, the abduction of Daniel Pearl in 2002, and the attack on the Sri Lankan cricket team in Lahore in 2009. A predominantly Punjabi group, the LeJ has been labelled by Pakistani intelligence officials as one of the country's most virulent terrorist organisations.

Basra, the first Emir of LeJ, was killed in a police encounter in 2002. He was succeeded by Malik Ishaq, who was also killed, along with Ghulam Rasool Shah, in an encounter in Muzaffargarh in 2015. LeJ was banned by Pakistan in August 2001. The LeJ remains active, and has been designated as a terrorist organization by Australia, Canada, Pakistan, United Kingdom, United States and the United Nations.

Formation
Basra, along with Akram Lahori and Malik Ishaq, separated from Sipah-e-Sahaba and formed Lashkar-e-Jhangvi in 1996. The newly formed group took its name from Sunni cleric Haq Nawaz Jhangvi who led anti-Shia violence in the 1980s, one of the founders of the Sipah-e-Sahaba Pakistan(SSP). LJ's founders believed that the SSP had strayed from Jhangvi's ideals. Jhangvi was killed in an attack by Shia militants in 1990. Malik Ishaq, the operational chief of LJ, was released after 14 years by the Supreme Court of Pakistan on 14 July 2011, after the Court dropped 34 of the 44 charges against him, involving the killing of around 100 people, and granted him bail in the remaining 10 cases due to lack of evidence. In 2013, Ishaq was arrested at his home in Rahim Yar Khan of the Punjab province.

Activities
LJ initially directed most of its attacks against the Pakistani Shia Muslim community. It also claimed responsibility for the 1997 killing of four U.S. oil workers in Karachi. Lashkar-e-Jhangvi attempted to assassinate Pakistani Prime Minister Nawaz Sharif in 1999. Basra himself was killed in 2002 when an attack he was leading on a Shia settlement near Multan failed. Basra was killed due to the cross-fire between his group and police assisted by armed local Shia residents.

 In April 1999 the nephew of the then worldwide Khalifa, Mirza Tahir Ahmad, of the Ahmadiyya Muslim Community was assassinated. Some have since alleged the attack was carried about by Lashkar-e-Jhangvi.
 In March 2002 LJ members bombed a bus, killing 15 people, including 11 French citizens.
On 17 March 2002 at 11:00 am, two members of the Lashkar-e-Jhangvi bombed the International Protestant Church in Islamabad during a church service. Five people were killed, including two American women, two Pakistanis and an Afghan man. Forty-one more people were injured, including 27 foreigners. In July 2002 Pakistani police killed one of the alleged perpetrators and arrested four Lashkar-e-Jhangvi members in connection with the church attack. The LJ members confessed to the killings and said the attack was in retaliation for the U.S. attack on Afghanistan.
The Pakistani government Interior Ministry said that the suicide bomber involved in the assassination of Benazir Bhutto, along with the death of 20 others in Rawalpindi, belonged to Lashkar-e-Jhangvi on 27 December 2007.
Authorities believe Mohammed Aqeel, an LJ member, was the mastermind behind the March 2009 attack on the Sri Lanka national cricket team.
 LJ claimed responsibility for killing 26 Shia pilgrims on 20 September 2011 in the Mastung area of Balochistan. The pilgrims were travelling on a bus to Iran. In addition, 2 others were killed in a follow-up attack on a car on its way to rescue the survivors of the bus attack.
Afghan President Hamid Karzai blamed LJ for a bombing that killed 59 people at Abu Fazal shrine in the Murad Khane district of Kabul on 6 December 2011. Most of the dead were pilgrims marking Ashoura, the holiest day in the Shia calendar.
Lashkar-i-Jhangvi claimed responsibility for 13 lives lost in brutal attack on Shia pilgrims. in Quetta on 28 June: At least 13 people, two women and a policeman among them, were killed and over 20 others injured on Thursday in a bomb attack on a bus mainly carrying Shia pilgrims returning from Iran. Most of the pilgrims belonged to the Hazara community.
Claimed responsibility for January 2013 Pakistan bombings in Pakistan killing 125 people.
 Claimed responsibility for attacking Syed Muhammad Waseem Naqvi(student of Mohammad Ali Jinnah University).They attacked him about four times, Naqvi saved his life by his fast movements.
Claimed responsibility for February 2013 Quetta bombings in Pakistan killing 81 and wounding 178, mostly Shia people.
Claimed responsibility for June 15th 2013 Quetta bombings in Pakistan.
Claimed responsibility for the January 2014 attempted bombing of a school which killed one of its students, Aitzaz Hasan in Pakistan.
Claimed responsibility for January 2014 bombing in Mastung Balochistan killing 28 Zaireen/ Hazara Community.
Claimed responsibility of assassination of Pakistani politician Shuja Khanzada in August 2015.
Claimed responsibility for attack on Police training center Quetta Pakistan in October 2016 killing at least 61 people including cadets and army officers.

Headquarters 
Officials from Zabul province claim that Lashkar-e Jhangvi has a sanctuary in southern Afghanistan. Early on in 2016, Lashkar-e-Jhangvi leader Yousuf Mansoor Khurasani survived an insider attack in southern Afghanistan.

Affiliations
LJ has ties to the Pakistani Taliban, the Islamic Movement of Uzbekistan (IMU), Sipah-e-Sahaba (SSP), Ahle Sunnat Waljamaat (ASWJ), Al-Qaeda and Jundallah. Investigation found that Al Qaeda has been involved with training of LJ. 

Upon the death of Riaz Basra in May 2002, correspondence between al-Qaeda and LJ seems to have stopped.

Designation as a terrorist organization
The Government of Pakistan designated the LJ a terrorist organization in August 2001, and the U.S. classified it as a Foreign Terrorist Organization under U.S. law in January 2003. As a result, its finances are blocked worldwide by the U.S government.

See also

 List of Deobandi organisations
Ansar Al-Mujahideen
List of designated terrorist organizations
Madhe Sahaba Agitation
Anti-Shi'ism
Genocide of Kashmiri Shias
Persecution of Hazara people
Persecution of Shias by ISIL
Syed Ahmad Barelvi
Sipah-e-Sahaba Pakistan

References

Further reading
 Lashkar-e-Jhangvi Claims Islamic State Support in Quetta Attack, Newsweek Pakistan, 27 October 2016.
 Quetta attack: A primer on Lashkar-e-Jhangvi, who allegedly carried out strike, Firstpost, 26 October 2016.

External links
U.S. Department of State:Designation of Lashkar I Jhangvi as a Foreign Terrorist Organization, 2003
U.S Treasury Department:Treasury Department Statement Regarding the Designation of Lashkar i Jhangvi, 2003, downloaded from Google cache, 29 September 2005
People's Daily: "Explosion in Islamabad Kills Four, Wounds 40"

An early version of this article was adapted from the public domain U.S. federal government sources.

 
Anti-Shi'ism
Jihadist groups in Afghanistan
Jihadist groups in Pakistan
Organisations designated as terrorist by the United Kingdom
Organizations based in Asia designated as terrorist
Organisations designated as terrorist by Pakistan
Organizations designated as terrorist by the United States
1996 establishments in Pakistan
Violence against Shia Muslims in Pakistan
Organizations designated as terrorist by Canada
Deobandi organisations